Erland (Benedikt, Brodderi) Dryselius (1641 – 24 April 1708) was a Swedish Lutheran minister, historian, and translator.

Works
 Luna Turcica Eller Turkeske Måne..., Jönköping, 1694.
 Kort memorial uppå mag. Erlandi Dryselii P. P. Junecopensis tractater, som han af trycket uthgå låtit..., c. 1700
 Korrt och enfaldig Kyrkiohistoria öfver Gamla och Nya Testamentet, 1704–08.

External links
 www.dryselius.se
 Projeckt Runeberg - Svenskt biografiskt handlexikon
 Projeckt Runeberg - Nordic Authors
 Oriental Reflections Early Oriental scholarship and literature in Sweden
 Swedish National Library - Dryselius, Erland Brodderi
 Dryselius
 "Turkey, Sweden and the EU Experiences and Expectations", Report by the Swedish Institute for European Policy Studies, April 2006, p. 6

1641 births
1708 deaths
17th-century Swedish historians
17th-century Swedish Lutheran priests
18th-century Swedish Lutheran priests
18th-century Swedish historians